A total solar eclipse occurred on September 9, 1904. A solar eclipse occurs when the Moon passes between Earth and the Sun, thereby totally or partly obscuring the image of the Sun for a viewer on Earth. A total solar eclipse occurs when the Moon's apparent diameter is larger than the Sun's, blocking all direct sunlight, turning day into darkness. Totality occurs in a narrow path across Earth's surface, with the partial solar eclipse visible over a surrounding region thousands of kilometres wide. Totality was visible from German New Guinea (the part now belonging to Marshall Islands) on September 10 and Chile on September 9.

Related eclipses

Solar eclipses 1902–1907

Saros 133

Inex series

Tritos series

Notes

References 

1904 09 09
1904 09 09
1904 in science
September 1904 events